Siu A Chau is an uninhabited island of Hong Kong, part of the Soko Islands group, located south of Lantau Island.

Geography
Siu A Chau is the northernmost and the second largest of the Soko Islands, after Tai A Chau. It is dumbbell-shaped and has a rugged indented coastline with steep slopes. The highest point of the island is at 74 meters. A beach lies to the south, and another to the north of the island.

Administration
Siu A Chau is a recognized village under the New Territories Small House Policy.

History
In 1937, Walter Schofield, then a Cadet Officer in the Hong Kong Civil Service, wrote that Siu A Chau was "another settlement of early man" and that it had a "fishing village of huts very different from ordinary Chinese dwellings" at the time of writing.

Features
There is a temple on the south side of the island.

A low-level radioactive waste (LLRW) facility began operation at Siu A Chau in July 2005. Low-level radioactive wastes which had previously been stored in disused tunnels, two factories and five hospitals were subsequently transferred to the Siu A Chau facility. Part of this waste was relocated from the disused Mount Parish air-raid tunnels at Queen's Road East, in Wan Chai. The 55 m3 of LLRW stored there had raised objections. The opening ceremony of the facility was held in June 2006.

References

External links

 Webpage about Siu A Chau Tin Hau Temple 
 Delineation of area of existing village Siu A Chau (South Lantao) for election of resident representative (2019 to 2022)

Islands District
Uninhabited islands of Hong Kong
Villages in Islands District, Hong Kong
Islands of Hong Kong
Populated places in Hong Kong